Colonel Harland David Sanders (September 9, 1890 
December 16, 1980) was an American businessman, best known for founding fast food chicken restaurant chain Kentucky Fried Chicken (also known as KFC) and later acting as the company's brand ambassador and symbol. His name and image are still symbols of the company.

Sanders held a number of jobs in his early life, such as steam engine stoker, insurance salesman, and filling station operator. He began selling fried chicken from his roadside restaurant in North Corbin, Kentucky, during the Great Depression. During that time, Sanders developed his "secret recipe" and his patented method of cooking chicken in a pressure fryer. Sanders recognized the potential of the restaurant franchising concept, and the first KFC franchise opened in South Salt Lake, Utah, in 1952. When his original restaurant closed, he devoted himself full-time to franchising his fried chicken throughout the country.

The company's rapid expansion across the United States and overseas became overwhelming for Sanders. In 1964, then 73 years old, he sold the company to a group of investors led by John Y. Brown Jr. and Jack C. Massey for $2 million. However, he retained control of operations in Canada, and he became a salaried brand ambassador for Kentucky Fried Chicken. In his later years, he became highly critical of the food served by KFC restaurants, as he believed they had cut costs and allowed quality to deteriorate.

Life and career

1890–1906: Early life

He was the oldest of three children born to Wilbur David and Margaret Ann (née Dunlevy) Sanders. His mother was of Irish and Dutch descent. The family attended the Advent Christian Church. His father was a mild and affectionate man who worked his  farm, until he broke his leg in a fall. He then worked as a butcher in Henryville for two years. Sanders' mother was a devout Christian and strict parent, continuously warning her children of "the evils of alcohol, tobacco, gambling, and whistling on Sundays".

Sanders' father died in 1895. His mother got work in a tomato cannery, and the young Harland was left to look after and cook for his siblings. By the age of seven, in 1897, he was reportedly skilled with bread and vegetables, and improving with meat; the children foraged for food while their mother was away at work for days at a time. In 1899, his mother remarried to Edward Park, but according to the 1900 census, his mother was widowed again. When he was 10, in 1900, Sanders began to work as a farmhand.

In 1902, Sanders' mother remarried, to William Broaddus, and the family moved to Greenwood, Indiana. Sanders had a tumultuous relationship with his stepfather. In 1903 (age 12), he dropped out of seventh grade (later stating that "algebra's what drove me off"), and went to live and work on a nearby farm. At age 13, he left home and took a job painting horse carriages in Indianapolis. When he was 14, he moved to southern Indiana to work as a farmhand.

1906–1930: Various jobs
In 1906, with his mother's approval, Sanders left the area to live with his uncle in New Albany, Indiana. His uncle worked for the streetcar company, and secured Sanders a job as a conductor.

Sanders falsified his date of birth and enlisted in the United States Army in October 1906 (age 16), completing his service commitment as a wagoner (see teamster) in Cuba being awarded the Cuban Pacification Medal (Army). He was honorably discharged in February 1907 and moved to Sheffield, Alabama, where his uncle lived. There, he met his brother Clarence, who had also moved there in order to escape their stepfather. The uncle worked for the Southern Railway, and secured Sanders a job there as a blacksmith's helper in the workshops. After two months, Sanders moved to Jasper, Alabama, where he got a job cleaning out the ash pans of trains from the Northern Alabama Railroad (a division of the Southern Railway) when they had finished their runs.

Sanders progressed to become a fireman (steam engine stoker) from the age of 16. He worked the job for nearly three years until he was fired for "insubordination" after he got sick.

Sanders found laboring work with the Norfolk and Western Railway from 1909. While working on the railroad, he met Josephine King of Jasper, Alabama, and they were married shortly afterwards on June 15, 1909, in Jasper. They would go on to have three children, Margaret Josephine Sanders, born March 29, 1910, in Jasper, Alabama and died October 19, 2001, in West Palm Beach, Florida, Harland David Sanders Jr. on April 23, 1912, in Tuscumbia, Alabama, who died on September 15, 1932, in Martinsville, Indiana, from infected tonsils, and Mildred Marie Sanders Ruggles, born October 15, 1919, in Jeffersonville, Indiana and died September 21, 2010, in Lexington, Kentucky. He then found work as a fireman on the Illinois Central Railroad, and he and his family moved to Jackson, Tennessee. By night, Sanders studied law by correspondence through the La Salle Extension University. Sanders lost his job at Illinois after brawling with a colleague. While Sanders moved to work for the Rock Island Railroad, Josephine and the children went to live with her parents.

After a while, Sanders began to practice law in Little Rock, which he did for three years, earning enough in fees for his family to move with him. His legal career ended after a courtroom brawl with his own client destroyed his reputation. This period represented a low point for Sanders. As his biographer John Ed Pearce wrote, "[Sanders] had encountered repeated failure largely through bullheadedness, a lack of self-control, impatience, and a self-righteous lack of diplomacy."

Following the incident, Sanders was forced to move back in with his mother in Henryville, and went to work as a laborer on the Pennsylvania Railroad. In 1916, the family moved to Jeffersonville, where Sanders got a job selling life insurance for the Prudential Life Insurance Company. Sanders was eventually fired for insubordination. He moved to Louisville and got a sales job with Mutual Benefit Life of New Jersey.

In 1920 (age 30), Sanders established a ferry boat company, which operated a boat on the Ohio River between Jeffersonville and Louisville. He canvassed for funding, becoming a minority shareholder himself, and was appointed secretary of the company. The ferry was an instant success. Around 1922 he took a job as secretary at the Chamber of Commerce in Columbus, Indiana. He admitted that he was not very good at the job, and resigned after less than a year. Sanders cashed in his ferry boat company shares for $22,000 ($ today) and used the money to establish a company manufacturing acetylene lamps. The venture failed after Delco introduced an electric lamp that it sold on credit.

Sanders moved to Winchester, Kentucky, to work as a salesman for the Michelin Tire Company. He lost his job in 1924 when Michelin closed its New Jersey manufacturing plant. In 1924, by chance, he met the general manager of Standard Oil of Kentucky, who asked him to run a service station in Nicholasville. In 1930, the station closed as a result of the Great Depression.

1930–1952: Later career
In 1930, the Shell Oil Company offered Sanders a service station in North Corbin, Kentucky, rent free, in return for paying the company a percentage of sales. Sanders began to serve chicken dishes and other meals such as country ham and steaks. Initially he served the customers in his adjacent living quarters before opening a restaurant. It was during this period that Sanders was involved in a shootout with Matt Stewart, a local competitor, over the repainting of a sign directing traffic to his station. Stewart killed a Shell employee who was with Sanders and was convicted of murder, eliminating Sanders' competition. Sanders was commissioned as a Kentucky Colonel in 1935 by Kentucky governor Ruby Laffoon. His local popularity grew, and, in 1939, food critic Duncan Hines visited Sanders's restaurant and included it in Adventures in Good Eating, his guide to restaurants throughout the US. The entry read:

In July 1939, Sanders acquired a motel in Asheville, North Carolina. His North Corbin restaurant and motel was destroyed in a fire in November 1939, and Sanders had it rebuilt as a motel with a 140-seat restaurant. By July 1940 (age 50), Sanders had finalized his "Secret Recipe" for frying chicken in a pressure fryer that cooked the chicken faster than pan frying. As the United States entered World War II in December 1941, gas was rationed, and as the tourism dried up, Sanders was forced to close his Asheville motel. He went to work as a supervisor in Seattle until the latter part of 1942. He later ran cafeterias for the government at an ordnance works in Tennessee, followed by a job as assistant cafeteria manager in Oak Ridge, Tennessee.

He left his mistress, Claudia Ledington-Price, as manager of the North Corbin restaurant and motel. In 1942, he sold the Asheville business. In 1947, he and Josephine divorced and Sanders married Claudia in 1949, as he had long desired. Sanders was "re-commissioned" as a Kentucky Colonel in 1950 by his friend, Governor Lawrence Wetherby.

1952–1980: Kentucky Fried Chicken

In 1952, Sanders franchised his secret recipe "Kentucky Fried Chicken" for the first time, to Pete Harman of South Salt Lake, Utah, the operator of one of that city's largest restaurants. In the first year of selling the product, restaurant sales more than tripled, with 75% of the increase coming from sales of fried chicken. For Harman, the addition of fried chicken was a way of differentiating his restaurant from competitors; in Utah, a product hailing from Kentucky was unique and evoked imagery of Southern hospitality. Don Anderson, a sign painter hired by Harman, coined the name Kentucky Fried Chicken. After Harman's success, several other restaurant owners franchised the concept and paid Sanders $0.04 per chicken.

Sanders believed that his North Corbin restaurant would remain successful indefinitely; however, he sold it at age 65 after the new Interstate 75 reduced customer traffic. Left only with his savings and US$105 a month from Social Security, Sanders decided to begin to franchise his chicken concept in earnest, and traveled the US looking for suitable restaurants. After closing the North Corbin site, Sanders and Claudia opened a new restaurant and company headquarters in Shelbyville in 1959. Often sleeping in the back of his car, Sanders visited restaurants, offered to cook his chicken, and if workers liked it negotiated franchise rights.

Although such visits required much time, eventually potential franchisees began visiting Sanders instead. He ran the company while Claudia mixed and shipped the spices to restaurants. The franchise approach became highly successful; KFC was one of the first fast food chains to expand internationally, opening outlets in Canada and later in the UK, Australia, Mexico and Jamaica by the mid-1960s. Sanders obtained a patent protecting his method of pressure frying chicken in 1962, and trademarked the phrase "It's Finger Lickin' Good" in 1963.

The company's rapid expansion to more than 600 locations became overwhelming for the aging Sanders. In 1964, then 73 years old, he sold the Kentucky Fried Chicken corporation for $2 million ($ million today) to a partnership of Kentucky businessmen headed by John Y. Brown Jr., a 29-year-old lawyer and future governor of Kentucky, and Jack C. Massey, a venture capitalist and entrepreneur. Sanders became a salaried brand ambassador. The initial deal did not include the Canadian operations, which Sanders retained, nor the franchising rights in the UK, Florida, Utah, and Montana, which Sanders had already sold to others.

In 1965, Sanders moved to Mississauga, Ontario, a suburb of Toronto, to oversee his Canadian franchises and continued to collect franchise and appearance fees both in Canada and in the US. Sanders bought and lived in a bungalow at 1337 Melton Drive in the Lakeview area of Mississauga from 1965 until his death in 1980. In September 1970 he and his wife were baptized in the Jordan River. He also befriended Billy Graham and Jerry Falwell.

Sanders remained the company's symbol after selling it, traveling  a year on the company's behalf and filming many TV commercials and appearances. He retained much influence over executives and franchisees, who respected his culinary expertise and feared what The New Yorker described as "the force and variety of his swearing" when a restaurant or the company varied from what executives described as "the Colonel's chicken". One change the company made was to the gravy, which Sanders had bragged was so good that "it'll make you throw away the durn chicken and just eat the gravy" but which the company simplified to reduce time and cost. As late as 1979 Sanders made surprise visits to KFC restaurants, and if the food disappointed him, he denounced it to the franchisee as "God-damned slop" or pushed it onto the floor. In 1973, Sanders sued Heublein Inc.—the then parent company of Kentucky Fried Chicken—over the alleged misuse of his image in promoting products he had not helped develop. In 1975, Heublein Inc. unsuccessfully sued Sanders for libel after he publicly described their gravy as being "sludge" with a "wall-paper taste".

Sanders and his wife reopened their Shelbyville restaurant as "Claudia Sanders, The Colonel's Lady" and served KFC-style chicken there as part of a full-service dinner menu, and talked about expanding the restaurant into a chain. He was sued by the company for it. After reaching a settlement with Heublein, he sold the Colonel's Lady restaurant, and it has continued to operate, currently as the Claudia Sanders Dinner House. It serves his "original recipe" fried chicken as part of its non-fast-food dinner menu, and it is the only non-KFC restaurant that serves an authorized version of the fried chicken recipe.

Sanders remained critical of Kentucky Fried Chicken's food. In the late 1970s he told the Louisville Courier-Journal:

Public image and personality
After being recommissioned as a Kentucky colonel in 1950 by Governor Lawrence Wetherby, Sanders began to dress the part, growing a goatee and wearing a black frock coat (later switching to a white suit), a string tie, and referring to himself as "Colonel". His associates went along with the title change, "jokingly at first and then in earnest", according to biographer Josh Ozersky.

He never wore anything else in public during the last 20 years of his life, using a heavy wool suit in the winter and a light cotton suit in the summer. He bleached his mustache and goatee to match his white hair.

John Y. Brown Jr. remembered Sanders as "a brilliant man with a gourmet flair for food, a visionary and a great motivator, with the style of a showman and the discipline of a Vince Lombardi."

Death

Sanders was diagnosed with acute leukemia in June 1980. He died at Louisville Jewish Hospital of pneumonia six months later, on December 16, at the age of 90. Sanders had remained active until the month before his death, appearing in his white suit to crowds. His body lay in state in the rotunda of the Kentucky State Capitol in Frankfort after a funeral service at the Southern Baptist Theological Seminary Chapel, which was attended by more than 500 people. His body would also be displayed in an open casket during a memorial service that was held at KFC's headquarters in Louisville; 1,000 to 1,200 people would attend this service. Sanders was buried in his characteristic white suit and black western string tie in Cave Hill Cemetery in Louisville. 

His wife, Claudia, died on December 31, 1996, at the age of 94.

By the time of Sanders' death, there were an estimated 6,000 KFC outlets in 48 countries worldwide, with $2 billion in sales annually.

Legacy

As a symbol of the KFC brand

A fictionalized Colonel Sanders has repeatedly appeared as a mascot in KFC's advertising and branding. Sanders has been voiced by impressionists in radio ads, and from 1998 to 2001 an animated version of him voiced by Randy Quaid appeared in television commercials.

In May 2015, KFC brought the Colonel Sanders character back in new television advertisements, played by comedian Darrell Hammond. Some commentators felt the new portrayal was distasteful and disrespectful of the actual man's legacy.

In August 2015, KFC launched a new campaign, this time with comedian Norm Macdonald portraying Sanders; the first ad of the campaign makes direct reference to the Hammond campaign, with a brief piece of footage of Hammond followed by Macdonald's Colonel declaring his predecessor an impostor.

In February 2016, yet another portrayal was introduced with Jim Gaffigan as the Colonel, shown bolting awake in bed and telling his wife about his recurring nightmare of Macdonald's Colonel "pretending to be me".

By July 2016, George Hamilton was playing Colonel Sanders, parlaying his famous tan into an advertisement for KFC's "extra crispy" chicken.

During the airing of the 2016 SummerSlam, a commercial aired of WWE wrestler Dolph Ziggler dressed up as Colonel Sanders beating up a man in a chicken suit (played by fellow wrestler The Miz) in a wrestling ring.

In September 2016, comedian Rob Riggle played Sanders in an ad introducing a football team named "The Kentucky Buckets".

In January 2017, to advertise their "Georgia Gold Honey Mustard BBQ" Chicken offerings, actor Billy Zane took over the role as the "Solid Gold Colonel".

In April 2017, actor Rob Lowe was announced as the newest actor in the role of Colonel Sanders. Lowe said that as a child, he actually got to meet Harland Sanders.

WWE would return to using Colonel Sanders during 2017, showing ads of Shawn Michaels and Kurt Angle playing him, as well as announcing that Colonel Sanders would be available as a playable character in WWE 2K18 (accessible through the "create-a-wrestler" feature) as part of a product placement deal with KFC.

Ray Liotta then portrayed Sanders. Singer Reba McEntire was named as the newest Sanders in January 2018.

, actor Jason Alexander and professional strongman and actor Hafþór Júlíus Björnsson both portray Colonel Sanders.

In early 2019, Peter Weller portrayed a RoboCop version of Colonel Sanders. Later that year, Sean Astin played a Rudy Ruettiger version of the Colonel to commemorate the beginning of the NFL season. In 2019, a free video game was commissioned by the restaurant chain KFC and released for free called I Love You, Colonel Sanders! A parody of conventional dating sims, the primary objective of the player is to develop a romantic relationship with a fictionalized version of KFC's founder Colonel Sanders, portrayed as an attractive classmate at a cooking school.

In December 2020, a fictionalized Colonel Sanders was portrayed by Mario Lopez in the 2020 short film A Recipe for Seduction.

Beyond KFC
The Japanese Nippon Professional Baseball league has developed an urban legend of the "Curse of the Colonel". A statue of Colonel Sanders was thrown into a river and lost during a 1985 fan celebration, and (according to the legend) the "curse" has caused Japan's Hanshin Tigers to perform poorly since the incident. It was said that unless the statue was fully recovered, the Tigers would never win the Japan Series again. They did make it in 2003, 2005, and 2014 however. They lost in all three appearances, including a four-game sweep by the Chiba Lotte Marines in 2005, who hit 10 home runs in the first three games.

Characters based on Colonel Sanders have appeared in popular fiction. The Colonel appears as a character within the DC Comics multiverse in three promotional issues, with titles parodying other DC Comics titles - The Colonel of Two Worlds (a parody of Flash of Two Worlds), The Colonel Corps: The Crisis of Infinite Colonels (a parody of Crisis on Infinite Earths), and Across The Universe, teaming up with characters such as Green Lantern and Flash, and alternate versions of himself (such as a female version, a Teen Titans Go! version, and a chicken version) to battle villains such as the "Anti-Colonel" of Earth-3, "Colonel Grodd" (a Colonel version of Gorilla Grodd) and Larfleeze. The writer of the comics, Tony Bedard, said "It's been an honor, a privilege, and just plain fun working on the last two KFC comics. I'm super-excited the story is a trilogy now, with the Colonel planet-hopping across the DC Universe. As a former Green Lantern writer, it's great to revisit Hal Jordan and the Green Lantern Corps." In a 2018 episode of the soap opera General Hospital, Sanders is shown to know Malbolge, which he uses to disarm a bomb intended to compel him to reveal his secret recipe.

In the novel Kafka on the Shore by Haruki Murakami, Colonel Sanders appears when an "abstract concept" takes on the appearance of "a famous capitalist icon".

In 2017, KFC released a 96-page romance novella, Tender Wings of Desire, in time for Mother's Day. Set in Victorian England, it centers on Lady Madeline Parker, who "must choose between a life of order and a man of passion", and featuring Sanders as the love interest, and ostensibly the writer. It was made available as a free download via Amazon.

One of Colonel Sanders' white suits with its black clip-on bow-tie was sold at auction for $21,510 by Heritage Auctions on June 22, 2013. The suit had been given to Cincinnati resident Mike Morris by Sanders, who was close to Morris's family. The Morris family house was purchased by Col. Sanders, and Sanders lived with the family for six months. The suit was purchased by Kentucky Fried Chicken of Japan president Maseo "Charlie" Watanabe. Watanabe put on the famous suit after placing the winning bid at the auction event in Dallas, Texas.

In 2011, a manuscript of a book on cooking that Sanders apparently wrote in the mid-1960s was found in KFC archives. It includes some cooking recipes from Sanders as well as anecdotes and life lessons. KFC said it was planning to try some of the recipes and to publish the 200-page manuscript online.

In 2010, the Oscar-winning animated short LOGORAMA prominently featured a rotoscoped depiction of Colonel Sanders during the early fast-food restaurant scenes.

Charitable giving
Before his death, Sanders used his stock holdings to create the Colonel Harland Sanders Charitable Organization, a registered Canadian charity. The wing of Mississauga Hospital for women's and children's care is named The Colonel Harland Sanders Family Care Centre in honor of his substantial donation. Sanders' foundation has also made sizeable donations to other Canadian children's hospitals including the McMaster Children's Hospital, IWK Health Centre, and Stollery Children's Hospital. The Toronto-based foundation disbursed $500,000 to other Canadian charities in 2016, according to its tax return filed with the Canada Revenue Agency.

Discography
 1967 Christmas Eve with Colonel Sanders (RCA: PRS 256)
 1968 Christmas Day with Colonel Sanders (RCA: PRS 274)
 1969 Christmas with Colonel Sanders (RCA: PRS 291)

References
Notes

Citations

Sources

Further reading
 Pearce, John, The Colonel (1982)

External links

 CBC Archives CBC Radio talks with Colonel Sanders about Canadian food and cooking (from 1957).
 FBI Records: The Vault – Harland David "Colonel" Sanders at fbi.gov
 
 

1890 births
1980 deaths
20th-century American businesspeople
American chief executives of food industry companies
American food company founders
American restaurateurs
American salespeople
American transportation businesspeople
Burials at Cave Hill Cemetery
Businesspeople from Indiana
Businesspeople from Louisville, Kentucky
Deaths from cancer in Kentucky
Deaths from leukemia
Deaths from pneumonia in Kentucky
Fast food advertising characters
Male characters in advertising
Fast-food chain founders
Kentucky culture
KFC people
La Salle Extension University alumni
Michelin people
People from Greenwood, Indiana
People from Henryville, Indiana
People from Laurel County, Kentucky
People from Mississauga
Prudential Financial people
United States Army soldiers
American people of Dutch descent
American people of Irish descent
Child soldiers
People using the U.S. civilian title colonel